Cymbidium tracyanum, or Tracy's cymbidium, is a species of orchid. It flowers in the fall and winter with large, fragrant 4" flowers. This is a large sized, cold to cool growing plant that can withstand near-freezing temperatures.

References 

tracyanum
Orchids of Thailand